Lal Chand Yamla Jatt (28 March 1910 – 20 December 1991) was a noted Indian folk singer in the Punjabi-language. His trademark was his soft strumming of the tumbi and his turban tying style known traditionally as "Turla". Many consider him to be the pinnacle of the Punjabi music and an artist who arguably laid the foundation of contemporary Punjabi music in India.

Early life
He was born to Khera Ram and Harnam Kaur. His birthplace was Chak No. 384 in Lyallpur District now Faisalabad, Punjab Pakistan and after partition of India in 1947, he relocated to the Jawahar Nagar area, Ludhiana in India. He was from Punjabi Batwal family. He started his musical career with his younger brother, Jas Ballagan. Together they were known as the tota brothers and toured all across Punjab. He was trained in vocal singing by Pandit Dyall and Chaudhry Majid and his writing skills were honed by Sundar Das Aasi. He was married to Ram Rakhi in 1930, with whom he had two daughters and five sons. His eldest son is Kartar Chand and younger one is Jasdev Chand.

Career
His most famous songs were "Das Main Ki Pyar Wichon Khattya" and "Satgur Nanak Teri Leela Nyaari Ae" and "Whisky Di Botal Wargi". He recorded some duet songs with Mohinderjit Kaur Sekhon, who was a recording artist with All India Radio (AIR), Jalandhar. He also popularized singing of Dulla Bhatti, Shahni Kaulan and Puran Bhagat. His first recording was with HMV in 1952 and till last he remained with HMV.  He performed all over the world and many times performed with Alam Lohar. They were also good friends. He also popularized the Tumbi, a traditional North Indian instrument. His music has been sampled by Punjabi MC on his best-selling bhangra album Legalised. Later 2018, a music producer from Pakistan with stage name 'Ghauri', recreated his famous "Das Main Ki Pyar Wichon Khattya"   with modern touch that went viral over video-sharing social networking service TikTok ending up Bollywood actors and actresses making short video over the same track on tiktok platform.

Ved Parkash took lessons from Lal Chand Yamla Jatt and considered him his music-guru. Ved Parkash still keeps a picture of Yamla Jatt in his wallet to this day.

Awards
He was awarded the Gold Medal By Indian Prime minister Pt. Jawaharlal Nehru in 1956. He was awarded a lifetime contribution award in 1989 by National Academy of Dance, Drama and Music, Delhi, India.

Discography
 Khedan De Din Chaar
 Jawani Meri Rangli
 Das Main Ki Pyar Wichon Khatya- released in 1963 
 Mittran Di Maa Marri
 Tara Pave Boliyan
 Whiskey Di Botal Wargi
 Saiyaan Da Kotha
 Charkhi Rangli Teri
 Satguru Nanak Teri Leela Neyaari
Mein Teri Tu Mera

See also 
Alam Lohar
List of Punjabi singers

References

External links
 Ajit Punjabi Weekly. Retrieved 18 August 2016

Punjabi-language singers
1914 births
1991 deaths
Indian male folk singers
People from Ludhiana district
20th-century Indian singers
Singers from Faisalabad
20th-century Indian male singers